The Wegener–Bergeron–Findeisen process (after  Alfred Wegener, Tor Bergeron and ), (or "cold-rain process") is a process of ice crystal growth that occurs in mixed phase clouds (containing a mixture of supercooled water and ice) in regions where the ambient vapor pressure falls between the saturation vapor pressure over water and the lower saturation vapor pressure over ice. This is a subsaturated environment for liquid water but a supersaturated environment for ice resulting in rapid evaporation of liquid water and rapid ice crystal growth through vapor deposition.  If the number density of ice is small compared to liquid water, the ice crystals can grow large enough to fall out of the cloud, melting into rain drops if lower level temperatures are warm enough.

The Bergeron process, if occurring at all, is much more efficient in producing large particles than is the growth of larger droplets at the expense of smaller ones, since the difference in saturation pressure between liquid water and ice is larger than the enhancement of saturation pressure over small droplets (for droplets large enough to considerably contribute to the total mass). For other processes affecting particle size, see rain and cloud physics.

History
The principle of ice growth through vapor deposition on ice crystals at the expense of water was first theorized by the German scientist Alfred Wegener in 1911 while studying hoarfrost formation.  Wegener theorized that if this process happened in clouds and the crystals grew large enough to fall out, that it could be a viable precipitation mechanism.  While his work with ice crystal growth attracted some attention,  it would take another 10 years before its application to precipitation would be recognized.

In the winter of 1922, Tor Bergeron made a curious observation while walking through the woods.  He noticed that on days when the temperature was below freezing, the stratus deck that typically covered the hillside stopped at the top of the canopy instead of extending to the ground as it did on days when the temperature was above freezing.  Being familiar with Wegener's earlier work, Bergeron theorized that ice crystals on the tree branches were scavenging vapor from the supercooled stratus cloud, preventing it from reaching the ground.

In 1933, Bergeron was selected to attend the International Union of Geodesy and Geophysics meeting in Lisbon, Portugal where he presented his ice crystal theory.  In his paper, he stated that if the ice crystal population was significantly small compared to the liquid water droplets, that the ice crystals could grow large enough to fall out (Wegener's original hypothesis).  Bergeron theorized that this process could be responsible for all rain, even in tropical climates; a statement that caused quite a bit of disagreement between tropical and mid-latitude scientists.   In the late 1930s, German meteorologist Walter Findeisen extended and refined Bergeron's work through both theoretical and experimental work.

Required conditions

The condition that the number of droplets should be much larger than the number of ice crystals depends on the fraction of cloud condensation nuclei that would later (higher in the cloud) act as ice nuclei. Alternatively, an adiabatic updraft has to be sufficiently fast so that high supersaturation causes spontaneous nucleation of many more droplets than cloud condensation nuclei are present. In either case, this should happen not far below the freezing point as this would cause direct nucleation of ice. The growth of the droplets would prevent the temperature from soon reaching the point of fast nucleation of ice crystals.

The larger supersaturation with respect to ice, once present, causes it to grow fast thus scavenging water from the vapor phase. If the vapor pressure  drops below the saturation pressure with respect to liquid water , the droplets will cease to grow. If the updraft is too fast, all the droplets would finally freeze rather than evaporate.

A similar limit is encountered in a downdraft. Liquid water evaporates causing the vapor pressure  to rise, but if the saturation pressure with respect to ice  is rising too fast in the downdraft, all ice would melt before large ice crystals have formed.

Korolev and Mazin  derived expressions for the critical updraft and downdraft speed:

For values of  typical of clouds,  ranges from a few cm/s to a few m/s. These velocities can be easily produced by convection, waves or turbulence, indicating that it is not uncommon for both liquid water and ice to grow simultaneously. These velocities are common in convective downdrafts, but are not typical for stratus clouds.

Formation of ice crystals
The most common way to form an ice crystal starts with an ice nucleus in the cloud. Ice crystals can form from heterogeneous deposition, contact, immersion, or freezing after condensation. In heterogeneous deposition, an ice nucleus is simply coated with water. For contact, ice nuclei will collide with water droplets that freeze upon impact. In immersion freezing, the entire ice nucleus is covered in liquid water.

Water will freeze at different temperatures depending upon the type of ice nuclei present. Ice nuclei cause water to freeze at higher temperatures than it would spontaneously. For pure water to freeze spontaneously, called homogeneous nucleation, cloud temperatures would have to be . Here are some examples of ice nuclei:

Ice multiplication
 As the ice crystals grow, they can bump into each other and splinter and fracture, resulting in many new ice crystals. There are many shapes of  ice crystals to bump into each other. These shapes include hexagons, cubes, columns, and dendrites. This process is referred to as "ice enhancement" by atmospheric physicists and chemists.

Aggregation
The process of ice crystals sticking together is called aggregation. The different sizes and shapes of ice crystals fall at different terminal velocities and commonly collide and stick.

Accretion
When an ice crystal collides with supercooled water droplets it is called accretion (or riming). Droplets freeze upon impact and can form graupel. If the graupel formed is reintroduced into the cloud by wind, it may continue to grow larger and more dense, eventually forming hail.

Precipitation
Eventually this ice crystal will grow large enough to fall. It may even collide with other ice crystals and grow larger still through collision coalescence, aggregation, or accretion.

The Bergeron process often results in precipitation. As the crystals grow and fall, they pass through the base of the cloud, which may be above freezing. This causes the crystals to melt and fall as rain. There also may be a layer of air below freezing below the cloud base, causing the precipitation to refreeze in the form of ice pellets.  Similarly, the layer of air below freezing may be at the surface, causing the precipitation to fall as freezing rain. The process may also result in no precipitation, evaporating before it reaches the ground, in the case of forming virga.

See also
List of meteorology topics
Precipitation (meteorology)
Coalescence (meteorology)
Ice nucleus
Ice
Nucleation
Physical vapor deposition
Saturation vapor pressure

References

Wallace, John M. and Peter V. Hobbs: Atmospheric Science, 2006, .
Yau, M.K. and Rodgers, R.R.: "A Short Course in Cloud Physics", 1989, .

External links
Demonstration of the Bergeron Process

Cloud and fog physics